Lilong Haoreibi College, established in 1976, is a general degree college in Lilong, Manipur. It offers undergraduate courses in science and arts. It is affiliated to  Manipur University.

Departments

Science
Physics
Chemistry
Mathematics
Statistics
Botany
Zoology
Home Science

Arts
Manipuri
English
History
Geography
Political Science
Economics
Education
Philosophy

Accreditation
The college is recognized by the University Grants Commission (UGC).

See also
Education in India
Manipur University
Literacy in India
List of institutions of higher education in Manipur

References

External links
http://www.lhcollege.in/

Colleges affiliated to Manipur University
Educational institutions established in 1976
Universities and colleges in Manipur
1976 establishments in Manipur